Events from the year 1996 in Canada.

Incumbents

Crown 
 Monarch – Elizabeth II

Federal government 
 Governor General – Roméo LeBlanc 
 Prime Minister – Jean Chrétien
 Chief Justice – Antonio Lamer (Quebec) 
 Parliament – 35th

Provincial governments

Lieutenant governors 
Lieutenant Governor of Alberta – Gordon Towers (until April 17) then Bud Olson
Lieutenant Governor of British Columbia – Garde Gardom
Lieutenant Governor of Manitoba – Yvon Dumont
Lieutenant Governor of New Brunswick – Margaret McCain
Lieutenant Governor of Newfoundland – Frederick Russell
Lieutenant Governor of Nova Scotia – James Kinley
Lieutenant Governor of Ontario – Hal Jackman
Lieutenant Governor of Prince Edward Island – Gilbert Clements
Lieutenant Governor of Quebec – Martial Asselin (until August 8) then Jean-Louis Roux
Lieutenant Governor of Saskatchewan – Jack Wiebe

Premiers 
Premier of Alberta – Ralph Klein 
Premier of British Columbia – Mike Harcourt (until February 22) then Glen Clark 
Premier of Manitoba – Gary Filmon 
Premier of New Brunswick – Frank McKenna 
Premier of Newfoundland – Clyde Wells (until January 26) then Brian Tobin 
Premier of Nova Scotia – John Savage 
Premier of Ontario – Mike Harris 
Premier of Prince Edward Island – Catherine Callbeck (until October 9) then Keith Milligan (October 9 to November 27) then Pat Binns 
Premier of Quebec – Jacques Parizeau (until January 29) then Lucien Bouchard
Premier of Saskatchewan – Roy Romanow

Territorial governments

Commissioners 
 Commissioner of Yukon – Judy Gingell 
 Commissioner of Northwest Territories – Helen Maksagak

Premiers 
Premier of the Northwest Territories – Don Morin 
Premier of Yukon – John Ostashek (until October 19) then Piers McDonald

Events

January to March
January 14 – A free trade agreement with Israel is announced.
January 15 – The Corel Centre opens in Ottawa.
January 25 – Jean Chrétien launches a major cabinet shuffle. Pierre Pettigrew and Stéphane Dion are brought in, despite not having seats in Parliament.
January 26 – Brian Tobin becomes premier of Newfoundland, replacing Clyde Wells.
January 29 – Lucien Bouchard becomes premier of Quebec, replacing Jacques Parizeau.
February 7 – Bob Rae, former premier of Ontario leaves politics.
February 14 – Mr. Dressup does his last show.
February 15 – At a ceremony marking the first National Flag of Canada Day, Chrétien throttles a protester in Hull, Quebec, launching a small controversy over the "Shawinigan Handshake".
February 17 – Michel Gauthier is elected new leader of the Bloc Québécois.
February 22 – Glen Clark becomes premier of British Columbia, replacing Michael Harcourt.
February 22 – Brian Tobin leads the Newfoundland Liberal Party to victory in the 1996 Newfoundland election.

March to June
March 6 – The federal budget continues the assault on the deficit.
March 26 – The Anik E-1 satellite malfunctions.
March 27 – The Quebec budget proposes sweeping cuts to government funding.
April 3 – All members of the Canadian Forces are ordered to spend the entire day searching for documents that may aid the Somalia inquiry.
April 5 – Gunman Mark Chahal kills nine relatives in Vernon, British Columbia before killing himself.
April 11 – The Ontario government announce a 15 per cent reduction in the civil service.
April 22 – John Nunziata is expelled from the Liberal caucus for voting against the budget.
April 23 – Nova Scotia, New Brunswick, and Newfoundland agree to replace their provincial sales taxes and the Goods and Services Tax with a Harmonized Sales Tax.
May 8 – The Ontario government cuts provincial income taxes by 30 per cent.
May 10 – Member of Parliament Jan Brown resigns from the Reform Party of Canada.
May 19 – Marc Garneau flies on a second space mission.
May 24 – Conrad Black's Hollinger takes over the Southam newspaper chain.
May 28 – The British Columbia New Democratic Party wins a surprise re-election.
June 10 – The Quebec government reintroduces the "Language police".
June 17 – Sheila Copps, who had resigned over the GST, wins back her Hamilton–Wentworth seat in a by-election.
 June 20 – Robert Thirsk flies aboard the Space Shuttle Columbia.
June 24 – A riot in Quebec City causes a million dollars in damage.

July to September
July 7 – July 11 – A major AIDS conference is held in Vancouver.
July 20 – July 21 – Floods in Quebec kill ten.
July 25 – Coach House Press closes.
August 8 – Former Prime Minister Kim Campbell is named consul general to Los Angeles.
August 8 – Jean-Louis Roux appointed Lieutenant-Governor of Quebec.
August 29 – Former B.C. Premier W.R. Bennett is found guilty of insider trading.
September 29 – Fifteen-year-old Melanie Ethier vanishes without a trace in New Liskeard, Ontario, sparking a decades-long police investigation.

October to December
October 4 – Defence Minister David Collenette resigns.
October 10 – Keith Milligan becomes premier of Prince Edward Island, replacing Catherine Callbeck.
October 19 – Piers McDonald becomes government leader of Yukon, replacing John Ostashek.
November – SaskTel becomes the first Canadian Internet Service Provider to roll out ADSL.
November – The last federally run Indian residential school (the Gordon Residential School), closed in Punnichy, Saskatchewan.
November 5 – Jean-Louis Roux forced to resign as Lieutenant Governor of Quebec when pictures of him at Nazi rallies in the 1930s are published.
November 27 – Pat Binns becomes premier of Prince Edward Island, replacing Keith Milligan.
December 1 – Dalton McGuinty is elected leader of the Ontario Liberal Party.
December 16 – Chrétien formally apologizes for lying about the GST.

Full date unknown
Karen Kain becomes the first Canadian to win the Cartier Lifetime Achievement Award.
General Jean Boyle resigns over Somalia Affair controversy.
Canada sends over a thousand troops to take part in IFOR.
James McGill Statue unveiled.

Arts and literature

New books
John Ralston Saul: The Unconscious Civilization
Nancy Huston: Slow Emergencies
Pierre Berton: Farewell to the Twentieth Century
Elisabeth Harvor: Let Me Be the One
Yann Martel: Self
Timothy Findley: You Went Away
Di Brandt: Dancing Naked: Narrative Strategies for Writing Across Centuries
Douglas Coupland: Polaroids from the Dead
Guy Vanderhaeghe: The Englishman's Boy

Awards
 Giller Prize for Canadian Fiction: Margaret Atwood, Alias Grace
 See 1996 Governor General's Awards for a complete list of winners and finalists for those awards.
Books in Canada First Novel Award: Keath Fraser, Popular Anatomy
Geoffrey Bilson Award: Marianne Brandis, Rebellion: A Novel of Upper Canada
Gerald Lampert Award: Maureen Hynes, Rough Skin
Marian Engel Award: Barbara Gowdy
Pat Lowther Award: Lorna Crozier, Everything Arrives at the Light
Stephen Leacock Award: Marsha Boulton, Letters from the Country
Trillium Book Award English: Anne Michaels, Fugitive Pieces
Trillium Book Award French: , Le Pied de Sappho and Alain Bernard Marchand, Tintin au pays de la ferveur
Vicky Metcalf Award: Margaret Buffie

New music
Barenaked Ladies: Born on a Pirate Ship
Bruce Cockburn: The Charity of Night
The Tragically Hip: Trouble at the Henhouse
Sloan: One Chord to Another
Various artists: 20 Years of Stony Plain

Sport
January 15 – The Corel Centre opens in Ottawa
February 1 – With the exception of the Baltimore Stallions, all the U.S.-based CFL teams (San Antonio Texans, Las Vegas Posse, Shreveport Pirates, Birmingham Barracudas and the Memphis Mad Dogs) fold. The Stallions are relocated from Baltimore, Maryland, to Montreal, Quebec, and become the Montreal Allouettes
February 27 – The Los Angeles Kings trade Wayne Gretzky to the St. Louis Blues.
March 11 – The Montreal Canadiens play their final game at the Montreal Forum by defeating the Dallas Stars 4 to 1.
March 16 – The Montreal Canadiens play their first game at the Molson Centre against the New York Rangers.
May 19 – The Granby Prédateurs win their only Memorial Cup by defeating the Peterborough Petes  4 to 0. The entire tournament was played at Peterborough Memorial Centre in Peterborough, Ontario.
July 1 – The Winnipeg Jets relocate from Winnipeg, Manitoba, to Phoenix, Arizona, to become the Phoenix Coyotes.
July 19 – The Atlanta Olympics open. Canadian sprinter Donovan Bailey wins the 100-metre dash.
July 26 – Gretzky signs with the New York Rangers.
November 24 – The Toronto Argonauts win their 13th Grey Cup by defeating the Edmonton Eskimos in the 84th Grey Cup played at Ivor Wynne Stadium in Hamilton, Ontario. Mike Vanderjagt is named the game's Most Valuable Canadian
November 30 – Saskatchewan Huskies win their second Vanier Cup by defeating the St. Francis Xavier X-Men 31–12 in the 32nd Vanier Cup played at SkyDome in Toronto

Births

January to June
January 18 – Brittany Jones, pair skater
January 20 – Roland McKeown, ice hockey defenceman
January 22 – Joshua Ho-Sang, ice hockey player
January 31 – Ana Golja, actress and singer
February 5 – Megan McKinnon, actress
February 7 – Aaron Ekblad, hockey player
March 22 – Gig Morton, actor
March 26 – Alaine Chartrand, figure skater
April 26 – Jennifer Gillis, actress, dancer and singer
May 1 – William Nylander, ice hockey player
May 14 – Pokimane, online personality
May 19 – Sarah Grey, actress
June 12 – Mitchell Gordon, figure skater
June 14 – Madeline Edwards, ice dancer
June 20 
Sam Bennett, ice hockey player
Michael Dal Colle, ice hockey player
June 28 – Larissa Werbicki, rower

July to December
July 6 – Robert Naylor, actor
July 11 – Alessia Cara, singer/songwriter
July 19 – Hayleigh Bell, pair skater
August 7 – Liam James, actor
August 12 – Torri Webster, actress
August 29 – Linden Porco, actor
September 1 – Alexandra Kamieniecki, Polish figure skater
September 5 – Helaina Cyr, basketball player
September 26 – Cesar Corrales, Mexico-born actor and dancer
October 28 
 Laine MacNeil, actress
 Hanson Boakai, Guinea-born soccer player
November 5 – Victoria Moors, gymnast 
November 7 – Julianne Séguin, figure skater
November 27 – Amanda Todd, cyberbullying victim (d. 2012)
December 10 – Jérémy Gabriel, singer and actor

Full date unknown
Diego Gomes

Deaths

January to March
January 21 – René Marc Jalbert, soldier
February 7 – Lucien Maynard, leader of Alberta francophones
February 19 – Ernest Manning, politician and 8th Premier of Alberta (born 1908)
February 29 – Sinclair Ross, banker and author (born 1908)
March 28 – Edith Fowke, folk song collector, author and radio presenter (born 1913)

April to June
April 1 – Jean Le Moyne, journalist and politician (born 1913)
April 13 – Stewart McLean, politician (born 1913)
April 23 – Jean Victor Allard, general and first French-Canadian to become Chief of the Defence Staff (born 1913)
May 5 – Salli Terri, singer, arranger, recording artist and songwriter (born 1922)
May 9 – Eria Fachin, pop singer (born 1960)
May 22 – Robert Christie, actor and director (born 1913)
June 11 – George Hees, politician and Minister (born 1910)

July to September
July 1 – Harold Greenberg, film producer (born 1930)
July 3 – Rebecca Jane Middleton, murder victim (born 1979)
July 5 – Fred Davis, broadcaster and moderator of Front Page Challenge (born 1921)
July 18 – Robert Needham, journalist
July 22 – Carl Goldenberg, lawyer, arbitrator, mediator and Senator (born 1907)
August 10 – Walter MacNutt, organist (born 1910)
September 22 – Ludmilla Chiriaeff, ballet dancer, choreographer and director (born 1924)
September 23 – Joe Borowski, politician and activist (born 1933)

October to December

October 2 – Robert Bourassa, politician and 22nd Premier of Quebec (born 1933)
October 9 – Colleen Peterson, singer (born 1950)
October 11
Joe Morris, trade unionist and president of the Canadian Labour Congress (born 1913)
William Vickrey, professor of economics and Nobel Laureate (born 1914)
October 14 – Marcel Bourbonnais, politician (born 1918)
October 17 – Laura Sabia, social activist and feminist (born 1916)
October 19 – James Bourque, First Nations activist (born 1935)
October 23
Kurt Freund, physician and sexologist (born 1914)
Thomas Ide, educator and the founding Chairman of TVOntario (born 1919)
October 27 – Arthur Tremblay, politician and Senator (born 1917)
October 28 – Reuben Baetz, politician (born 1923)
November 9 – Joe Ghiz, politician and 29th Premier of Prince Edward Island (born 1945)
November 18 – John Josiah Robinette, lawyer (born 1906)
December 1 – Peter Bronfman, businessman (born 1928)
December 5 – Wilf Carter, country music singer, songwriter, guitarist and yodeller (born 1904)
December 21 – Clarence Gosse, physician and Lieutenant Governor of Nova Scotia (born 1912)
December 24 – Al Adair, politician, radio broadcaster and author (born 1929)
December 29 – Dorothy Livesay, poet (born 1909)

Full date unknown
Leo Landreville, politician and judge implicated in the Northern Ontario Natural Gas scandal (born 1910)

See also
 1996 in Canadian television
 List of Canadian films of 1996

References

 
Years of the 20th century in Canada
Canada
1996 in North America